American Nitrox Divers International (or ANDI) was founded by Ed Betts and Dick Rutkowski in 1988.

ANDI has since expanded to include offices in The United Kingdom, Israel, Australia, Sweden, Italy, Germany, The Netherlands, Greece, Japan, Taiwan, Republic of Korea, Republic of Maldives, Republic of Philippines, Latin America, Middle East, with its home office in the United States of America.

"SafeAir" is ANDI's term of art for breathing mixtures with extra oxygen added that are commonly known as nitrox or Enriched Air Nitrox (EAN).

Origins and history
ANDI was founded by Ed Betts and Dick Rutkowski in 1988 for the following purpose - "to standardize Instructor Training, Sport Diver Training, and refill station dispensing procedures for Enriched Air Nitrox diving." It is one of the first diver training organisations to specialize in technical diving and in the delivery of training for the use of nitrox. Between the years 1989 and 2000, ANDI is reported by the Divers Alert Network as certifying 49,118 divers out of a global total of 233,798 in the use of nitrox along with the certification of 3,196 instructors (out of a global total of 32,924) to specifically teach nitrox.

Certification
ANDI offers training programs for recreational diving, use of nitrox, technical diving (including rebreather), gas blending, equipment service, diver first aid and hyperbaric chamber personnel. Each program is identified by “a three-letter course code”. Programs specific to diver training are also classified by a “Level of Training” in order to “differentiate the programs and their scope of training” with Level 1 (L1) being “an introductory program for new divers or divers-in-training” while Level 5 (L5) is used for the highest level of training, i.e. “exploration courses" that "involve the use of other inert gases".

Open Water certification
 Introductory Scuba Experience - ISE
 ANDI Surface Diver - ASD
 Confined Environment Diver - CED
 Junior Sport Diver - (L1) JSD
 Open Water Sport Diver - (L1) OWD
 Ocean Scuba Diver-L2 OSD
 Ocean Diver - (L2) OCD
 Ocean Adventurer - (L2) OCA
 Advanced Open Water Diver - (L2) AOW
 Ocean Explorer - (L2) OCE
 Expert Scuba Diver - (L2) ESD
 Ocean Expert Explorer - (L2) OEE
 Rescue Diver - (L2) RSD
 Openwater Divemaster - (L2) CDM
 Assistant Instructor - (L2) ASI
 Open Water Instructor - (L1&2) OWI
 Advanced Openwater Instructor - AOWI
 Master Instructor - (L2) MSI

Specialty certification
 Dry Suit Diver - DSD
 Dry Suit Instructor - DSI
 Diver Propulsion Vehicle - DPV
 Night Diver - NGT
 Boat Diver - BOT
 Deeper Water Diver - DWD
 Navigation Diver - NAV
 Specialty Instructor - (L1-2) SPI
 Marine Environmentalist Specialty (MES)
 Total Buoyancy Control Specialty (TBC)

SafeAir (Nitrox) certification
 Limited SafeAir User - (L1) LSU
 Complete SafeAir User - (L2) CSU
 SafeAir Instructor - (L1 & 2) LSI & CSI
 SafeAir Wreck Diver - (L2) SWD
 Altitude Diver Specialty - (L2) ALD
 Specialty Instructor - (L2)
 SafeAir Divemaster - (L2) SDM
 Cavern Diver - (L2) CVN
 Cavern Diver Instructor - (L2) CVI

Technical certification
 Technical SafeAir Diver - (L3) TSD
 Technical Tri-Mix Diver - (L3) TTM
 Solo Diver - (L3) SLD
 Technical Wreck Diver - (L3) TWD
 Technical SafeAir Instructor - (L3) TSI
 Technical Instructor (Specialty) - (L3)
 Technical Divemaster - (L3) TDM
 Cave Diver (L3) CAV
 Cave Diver Instructor - (L3) CAI

Exploration certification
 Extended Range Diver - (L4) ERD
 Extended Range Instructor - (L4) ERI
 Intermediate Tri-Mix Diver - (L5) ITM
 Tri-Mix Diver - (L5) TMD
 Exploration Divemaster - (L4 & 5) EDM
 Tri-Mix Instructor - (L5) TMI
 Cave Explorer - (L4) CVX
 Cave Explorer Instructor - (L4) CXI
 Cave Explorer - (L5) CVX
 Cave Explorer Instructor - (L5) CXI

Rebreather certification
 Rebreather Intro - (L1) ICC
 Rebreather Diver - (L2) CCR
 Rebreather Diver - (L2) SCR
 Technical Rebreather Diver - (L3) TRD
 Rebreather Explorer - (L5) ERE
 Rebreather Instructor - (L1&2) RBI Technical Rebreather Instructor - (L3) TRI
 Exploration Rebreather Inst. - (L5) XRI

Technician certification
 Gas Blender - CGB
 Advanced Gas Blender - AGB
 Gas Blender Instructor - GBI
 Breathing Gas Dispenser Tech - BDT
 Breathing Gas Maintenance Tech - BMT
 SafeAir Service Technician - CST
 Service Technician Instructor - STI
 Eddy Current Tech - ECT
 Cylinder Inspection Technician - CIT
 Apprentice Service Technician - AST
 Professional Service Technician - PST
 Senior Service Technician - SST
 Master Service Technician - MST

Dive Medic certification
 Oxygen Administration Provider - OXP
 Oxygen Administration Instructor - OXI
 CPR Provider - CPR
 CPR Instructor - CPI
 First Aid Provider - FAP
 First Responder - FRS
 Dive Medic - DMD
 Dive Medic Instructor - DMI

Hyperbarics certification
 Hyperbaric Chamber Awareness - HCA: Introductory background on chamber applications.
 Hyperbaric Chamber Tender - HCT: Basic theory and procedures of hyperbaric chamber operation to assist a qualified chamber operator in a clinical environment. 
 Hyperbaric Chamber Operator - HCO (3 levels): Unit-specific chamber operation skills and the necessary theoretical background.
 Certified Hyperbaric Technician - CHT: Practical and theoretical chamber related equipment maintenance and operation skills. 
 Hyperbaric Chamber Operator Instructor - HCI

Recognition
ANDI obtained CEN certification from the EUF certification body in 2005.

ANDI ratings for recreational diving supervision and instruction are recognized by the Health and Safety Executive in the United Kingdom as of 2015.

ANDI is recognized as a technical diving organisation by the Chamber of Diving and Watersports in Egypt as of 2016.

See also

References

External links
ANDI official webpage
ANDI Europe webpage

Underwater diving training organizations
1988 establishments in New York (state)